DAHP may refer to:
 Washington State Department of Archaeology and Historic Preservation, an independent government agency in Washington state
 3-deoxy-D-arabinoheptulosonate-7-phosphate, an intermediate in the biosynthesis of shikimic acid